Tournament Players Club (TPC) is a chain of public and private golf courses operated by the PGA Tour. Most of the courses either are or have been hosts for PGA Tour events, with the remainder having frequently hosted events on the Korn Ferry Tour or PGA Tour Champions. In 2020, Harding Park became the first TPC course to host a major when it hosted the PGA Championship. 

The flagship Tournament Players Club for the PGA Tour was TPC Sawgrass in Ponte Vedra Beach, Florida, designed in 1980 and now the headquarters of the PGA Tour. TPC courses are designed to accommodate the large crowds attracted to high-profile tournaments. One of the drivers for the development of the chain by the PGA Tour is that by holding tournaments on its own courses, it avoids sharing the proceeds with external course owners.

In 2007, the PGA Tour reached an agreement with Heritage Golf Group for the sale of four TPC courses; TPC Eagle Trace, TPC Michigan, TPC Piper Glen, and TPC Prestancia. Although they would be owned and operated by Heritage Golf Group, all would retain their TPC branding. In February 2008, TPC Tampa Bay became the fifth course to be bought by Heritage Golf Group. The Tampa Bay course also retained its TPC branding under a licensing agreement.

Tournament Players Clubs

Resort/Daily Fee Courses
 TPC Toronto at Osprey Valley, Caledon, Ontario, Canada
Heathlands Course
Hoot Course
North Course

TPC Colorado at Heron Lakes, Berthoud, Colorado 
 TPC Deere Run, Silvis, Illinois
 TPC Danzante Bay, Loreto, Mexico
 TPC Dorado Beach, Dorado, Puerto Rico
 TPC Four Seasons Las Colinas, Irving, Texas
 TPC Harding Park, San Francisco, California
 TPC Las Vegas, Las Vegas, Nevada
 TPC Louisiana, New Orleans, Louisiana
 TPC Myrtle Beach, Myrtle Beach, South Carolina
 TPC San Antonio, San Antonio, Texas
 AT&T Canyons Course, designed by Pete Dye and PGA Tour player consultant Bruce Lietzke
 AT&T Oaks Course, designed by Greg Norman and PGA Tour player consultant Sergio García
 TPC Sawgrass, Ponte Vedra Beach, Florida
 THE PLAYERS Stadium Course
 Dye's Valley Course
 TPC Scottsdale, Scottsdale, Arizona
 Stadium Course
 Champions Course
 TPC Tampa Bay, Lutz, Florida

Private courses
 TPC Boston, Norton, Massachusetts
 TPC Craig Ranch, McKinney, Texas
 TPC Jasna Polana, Princeton, New Jersey
 TPC Kuala Lumpur, Kuala Lumpur, Malaysia
 TPC Michigan, Dearborn, Michigan
 TPC Piper Glen, Charlotte, North Carolina
 TPC Potomac at Avenel Farm, Potomac, Maryland
 TPC Prestancia, Sarasota, Florida
 Stadium Course
 Club Course
 TPC River Highlands, Cromwell, Connecticut
 TPC River's Bend, Cincinnati, Ohio
 TPC Southwind, Memphis, Tennessee
 TPC Stonebrae, Hayward, California
 TPC Sugarloaf, Duluth, Georgia
 Meadows 
 Stables
 Pines
 TPC Summerlin, Las Vegas, Nevada
 TPC Treviso Bay, Naples, Florida
 TPC Twin Cities, Blaine, Minnesota
 TPC Wisconsin, Madison, Wisconsin (opening in August 2023)

References

External links
 TPC.com Homepage
 TPC.com Course Locator
  PGA Tour

Golf clubs and courses in the United States
PGA Tour